Charles G. Austin (March 18, 1846 – October 21, 1925) was an American politician in the state of Washington. He served in the Washington State Senate from 1889 to 1893.

References

1846 births
1925 deaths
Republican Party Washington (state) state senators